Austrobryonia is a genus of flowering plants belonging to the family Cucurbitaceae.

Its native range is Australia.

Species:

Austrobryonia argillicola 
Austrobryonia centralis 
Austrobryonia micrantha 
Austrobryonia pilbarensis

References

Cucurbitaceae
Cucurbitaceae genera